The Carmel Development Company was a real-estate development company that operated in Carmel-by-the-Sea, California from 1902 to 1965. It was developed by James Franklin Devendorf and Frank Hubbard Powers. Powers provided the capital and did the legal work of the corporation. Devendorf was the general manager and oversaw subdividing and developing the land. Between 1900 to 1910 the Carmel Development Company purchased parcels of real estate from land holders that were subdivided into blocks & lots. This was the original footprint of what would become the incorporated City of Carmel-by-the-Sea in 1916 and the unincorporated Carmel Highlands. The company dissolved in 1965, after the sale of its final parcel known as the Glen Deven Mountain Lands.

History

In November 1900, San Francisco attorney Frank Hubbard Powers (1864-1920) purchased purchased the largest portion of land in Carmel. He bought seven hundred lots and eighty-nine acres of beachfront property from Dr. W. Sanders.

In 1902, James Franklin Devendorf (1856–1934) purchased all the unsold land in Carmel from developer and real estate agent Santiago J. Duckworth, who, in 1889, wanted to build a Catholic summer resort. He also bought land from French businessman Honoré Escolle.

On November 25, 1902, Devendorf became partners with Frank Hubbard Powers and formed the Carmel Development Company to operate in the town of Carmel-by-the-Sea. Powers provided the capital and did the legal work of the corporation. Devendorf was general manager and oversaw subdividing and developing the land. The first Board of Directors meeting for the Carmel Development Company was held on November 28, 1903 in San Francisco for the purpose of passing the by-laws, election of officers, and organization of the corporation.

Devendorf hired engineer Henry Fisher to layout the village of Carmel. The first subdivision map of the town was filed with the Monterey County Recorder in 1902. In November 1903, there were thirty families living in Carmel. That same year, the Company bought the Hotel Carmelo and later renamed it the Pine Inn and built the Carmel Development Company Building. It was the first modern "fireproof" commercial building in Carmel. It is still standing on the northwest corner of San Carlos Street and Ocean Avenue.

By 1904, Davendorf hired  Michael J. Murphy as the master builder for the Carmel Development Company. He built over 300 buildings in Carmel during his career. The Company bought their finished lumber to be used in building in San Francisco and costal steamers brought it down to the Monterey Wharf. At this time, there were 75 permanent residents, several stores, a restaurant, school, and Carmel City's first hotel, Hotel Carmelo. The Company even handled the mail, which was delivered by stagecoach and sorted at the Company's store. Under Devendorf's direction, Carmel became a colony of artists and writers and was established as a city in 1903. The Company also ran stagecoach to pick up visitors and prospective buyers from Monterey and the Del Monte Lodge in  Pebble Beach. In 1905, the Company installed its own water system. It pumped water from the Carmel River to a large tank at Ocean Avenue and Mountain View Avenue.

The first property sold by the Carmel Development Company was to E. A. Foster, an African American woman from Monroe, Michigan. She purchased two lots on Dolores Street and ten lots on the south side of Ocean Avenue between San Carlos and Mission Streets. The prices of the property were $500, secured by a five or ten dollar deposit.

By 1905, Devendorf used the Carmel Development Company provided a cottage for the first school and donated two lots on Lincoln Street near Ocean Avenue for the construction of the First Methodist Episcopal Church of Carmel, known as the community Church of the Wayfarer.

In 1906, the Carmel Development Company provided the Carmel Arts and Crafts Club with their first building on Ocean Avenue. Their first art exhibit was held in this temporary building. Devendorf was one of the founders of the Club to support artistic works. The Company donated the site that would become the Carmel Forest Theater. In 1919, the Forest Theater Society bought the Forest Theater and its grounds from the Company for $2,000.

After the 1906 San Francisco earthquake, more lots were sold because of relocated residents. By 1909, the Carmel Development Company advertised "Carmel-By-The-Sea" round trip railroad rates to get people to come down to the town. Devendorf had a row of pine trees planted down the middle of Ocean Avenue because of his love for trees and the beautiful environment of the Monterey Peninsula.

In 1906, the Carmel Development Company purchased land from local ranchers five miles south of Carmel, south of Point Lobos, where it developed the Carmel Highlands. In 1915, the Company developed the Highlands Inn in the Carmel Highlands, which was a resort hotel. His friend, marine artist William Frederic Ritschel helped Devendorf design the Highlands Inn.

The Company dissolved in 1965, after the sale of its final parcel known as the Glen Deven Mountain Lands, an  property in Big Sur.

See also
 James Franklin Devendorf
 Frank Hubbard Powers

External links

 Carmel Development Company Collection

References

American companies established in 1902
American companies disestablished in 1965
1902 establishments in California
1965 disestablishments in California